The Pot au Feu is an upcoming French historical romantic drama film directed by Tran Anh Hung starring Juliette Binoche and Benoît Magimel. Set in 1885, the film depicts a romance between a cook and the gourmet she works for. The character of the gourmet is based on Dodin-Bouffant created by Marcel Rouff in his novel  (The Passionate Epicure).

Cast
 Juliette Binoche
 Benoît Magimel

Production
The film was being shot in a castle in Segré-en-Anjou Bleu, Maine-et-Loire, in April and May 2022.

References

External links
 

Upcoming films
2020s romantic drama films
2020s historical drama films
French romantic drama films
French historical drama films
Cooking films
Films directed by Tran Anh Hung
Films set in 1885
Films set in France
Films shot in France
2020s French films